East Kirkton Quarry is a former limestone quarry in West Lothian, Scotland (East Kirkton Limestone), now better known as a fossil site known for terrestrial fossils from the fossil-poor Romer's gap, a 15 million year period at the beginning of the Carboniferous. The rocks and fossils are of Visean age, about 335 million years old. Best known are the labyrinthodont fossils, as the period coincides with the time where the modern lineages of tetrapods are thought to have evolved.

Location
The quarry is located in the town of Bathgate in West Lothian, Scotland. Geologically, it sits fairly central to the middle of the fossil-rich Scottish Central Lowlands. The site is dominated by volcanic tuff and limestone, and layered silica deposits, indicating the presence of a hot spring associated with volcanism.

The land next to the quarry itself is developed for housing.

It is designated as both a Regionally Important Geological Site and as a Site of Special Scientific Interest.

Fossils
The quarry was first mentioned in 1825, but most active in the 1830s and 1840s. During these years it yielded some interesting fossils of Carboniferous plants and eurypterids, though this was not uncommon for quarries in the area.  When the quarry closed, the place was for the most part, forgotten, until fossil hunter Stan Wood found fossils of primitive tetrapods there in 1984.  The quarry was bought by Wood for fossil collection, and yielded extremely interesting finds, including a huge sample of both terrestrial and marine fossil arthropods, examples of several classes of fishes and early amphibians. The latter include multiple examples of Balanerpeton (a temnospondyl), Silvanerpeton and Eldeceeon (basal anthracosaurs). A single specimen of a small animal named Westlothiana has variously been interpreted as an anthracosaur, a proto-amniote and possibly even the oldest known reptile.

The fossil of a small microsaur amphibian even including evidence of soft tissue found in the location was named Kirktonecta by Jennifer A. Clack in honour of the site.

References

Geology of Scotland
Sites of Special Scientific Interest in Edinburgh and West Lothian
Carboniferous Scotland
Viséan